Wonderful, Wonderful Times (German: Die Ausgesperrten) is a novel by Austrian writer Elfriede Jelinek, published in 1980 by Rowohlt Verlag. It is Jelinek's fifth book. An English translation by Michael Hulse was published in 1990 by Serpent's Tail. A film adaptation of the novel was released in 1982.

Plot and theme
The novel follows a group of four Viennese teens during the 1950s as they violently engage with the previous generation's Post-World War II legacy. The novel does not use traditional chapter demarcations and focuses largely on the internal thoughts of the characters. Through the portrayal of the Austrian family Witkowski, the reader is able to see the relation between daily fascism with the family and an undigested Austrian National Socialist history. The family patriarch, a former Nazi, makes up for his loss of power and one leg by terrorizing his family and sexually abusing his wife.

Characters

Major characters
 Rainer Maria Witkowski: The 18-year-old protagonist of the book. He is a gymnasium student and the twin of Anna Witkowski.
 Anna Witkowski: The 18-year-old twin of Rainer Witkowski. She is also a gymnasium student and a pianist.
 Hans Sepp: A 20-something mechanic.
 Sophie Pachhofen: An 18-year-old rich, athletic gymnasium student.

Minor characters
 Otto Witkowski: The father of Anna and Rainer, once a SS officer and now an amputee.
 Margarethe Witkowski: The mother of Anna and Rainer.
 Ms. Sepp: The mother of Hans and a fervent Communist.
 Gerhard Schweiger: A gymnasium student with Anna, Rainer, and Sophie.

External links
 Die Ausgesperrten at the Internet Movie Database

1980 Austrian novels
Novels by Elfriede Jelinek
Novels set in Vienna
Austrian novels adapted into films
Novels set in the 1950s
Rowohlt Verlag books
Serpent's Tail books